Thomas Armstrong (16 March 1872 – 5 July 1938) was an English first-class cricketer.  Armstrong was a right-handed batsman who bowled right-arm medium pace.  He was born in Keyworth, Nottinghamshire.

Armstrong made his first-class debut for Nottinghamshire against the Marylebone Cricket Club in 1892.  From 1892 to 1896, he represented the county in 6 first-class matches, the last of which came against the Marylebone Cricket Club during the 1896 season.  In his 6 first-class matches, he scored 67 runs at a batting average of 7.44, with a high score of 20*.

He died at the town of his birth on 5 July 1938.

Thomas Armstrong came from a sporting family. His brother Jack Armstrong played football for Nottingham Forest  and another brother Albert played for Forest Reserves on several occasions.

References

External links
Thomas Armstrong at Cricinfo
Thomas Armstrong at CricketArchive

1872 births
1938 deaths
People from Keyworth
Cricketers from Nottinghamshire
English cricketers
Nottinghamshire cricketers